Caporali is an Italian surname. Notable people with the surname include:

Bartolomeo Caporali, Italian Renaissance painter
Carlo Caporali (born 1994), Italian footballer 
Giovanni Battista Caporali ( 1476–1560), Italian Renaissance painter
Giulio Caporali, Italian Renaissance painter

Italian-language surnames